The Arnold Jung Lokomotivfabrik (Arnold Jung Locomotive Works) was a locomotive manufacturer, in particular of Feldbahn locomotives, in Kirchen, Rheinland-Pfalz, Germany.

History  
The firm was founded on 13 February 1885 as Jung & Staimer OHG by Arnold Jung and Christian Staimer. On 3 September 1885 the first locomotive was delivered. In 1913 the company was renamed Arnold Jung Lokomotivfabrik GmbH, Jungenthal. In 1976 locomotive production was stopped in favour of other products such as machine tools, transporters, armour plating, cranes and bridgelayers.

Jung built more than 12,000 locomotives. In the 1950s it built 51 DB Class 23 2-6-2 locomotives, including in 1959, number 23 105, the last new steam locomotive supplied to the Deutsche Bundesbahn. Jung also made boilers for other uses such as steam rollers.

By the 1950s Jung was also building diesel locomotives, such as the 42 standard gauge Egyptian Republic Railways 4211 class shunters in 1953–56.

Production ceased on 30 September 1993 and the factory closed, but the firm continues to exist as Jungenthal Systemtechnik GmbH.

Preserved Locomotives

There are 281 Arnold Jung steam locomotives still extant, according to the list at Steam Locomotive website.

Gallery

There is a 5025 steam machine in the "Museo Ferroviario de Santiago de Chile". This machine served in the railway that existed between the Chilean southern towns "Los Sauces" and "Capitan Pastene" (35 km). This railway was begun to be built in 1904 and in 1978 was abandoned.

References

External links

 Description of the firm of Jung at www.werkbahn.de 
 279 Surviving Arnold Jung Locomotives

Transport in Rhineland-Palatinate
Defunct locomotive manufacturers of Germany